Qaleh-ye Baba Khan (also Romanized as Qal‘eh-ye Bābā Khān, Qāl‘eh Bābā Khān, and Qal‘eh Bābākhān; also known as Ḩeşār-e Bābākhān) is a village in Jowzan Rural District, in the Central District of Malayer County, Hamadan Province, Iran. At the 2006 census, its population was 403, in 131 families.

References 

Populated places in Malayer County